Pseudomonas fragi is  a psychrophilic, Gram-negative bacterium that is responsible for dairy spoilage. Unlike many other members of the genus Pseudomonas, P. fragi does not produce siderophores. Optimal temperature for growth is 30 °C, however it can grow between 0 and 35 °C. Based on 16S rRNA analysis, P. fragi has been placed in the P. chlororaphis group.

References

External links
Type strain of Pseudomonas fragi at BacDive -  the Bacterial Diversity Metadatabase

Pseudomonadales
Bacteria described in 1902